Zalman Kornblit was a Jewish playwright, active in Yiddish theater in Romania in the early 20th century. His works included Eternal Diaspora (1906) and translations of Karl Gutzkow's Uriel Acosta and Friedrich Schiller's Thieves.

References
 Bercovici, Israil, O sută de ani de teatru evriesc în România ("One hundred years of Yiddish/Jewish theater in Romania"), 2nd Romanian-language edition, revised and augmented by Constantin Măciucă. Editura Integral (an imprint of Editurile Universala), Bucharest (1998). . p. 98.

Year of birth missing
Year of death missing
Jewish novelists